Thomas William Tyrwhitt-Drake (5 November 1926 – 8 March 2008) was an English first-class cricketer.

Tyrwhitt-Drake was born at Paddington in November 1926, to Reverend Charles William Tyrwhitt-Drake. He was educated at Haileybury, before going up to Trinity College, Cambridge. While studying at Cambridge he made his debut in first-class cricket for Cambridge University against Somerset at Bath in 1946. He made two further first-class appearances for Cambridge University, playing against the Marylebone Cricket Club in 1946 and Leicestershire in 1948. He scored 73 runs for Cambridge across six innings, with a top score of 33. Eleven years later he made a final appearance in first-class cricket for the Free Foresters against Oxford University. In addition to playing first-class cricket, Tyrwhitt-Drake also played minor counties cricket for Hertfordshire from 1946–58, making 85 appearances in the Minor Counties Championship.

He graduated from Trinity with a master's degree in 1949, and married Muriel Ann Makgill in September 1955, with the couple having three children. He died at Sidcup in March 2008.

References

External links

1926 births
2008 deaths
People from Paddington
People educated at Haileybury and Imperial Service College
Alumni of Trinity College, Cambridge
English cricketers
Cambridge University cricketers
Hertfordshire cricketers
Free Foresters cricketers